Costești is a town in Argeș County, Muntenia, Romania. The population  was 10,375.

The town administers six villages: Broșteni, Lăceni, Pârvu Roșu, Podu Broșteni, Smei and Stârci.

References

Populated places in Argeș County
Localities in Muntenia
Towns in Romania
Monotowns in Romania